Mexicana Universal Estado de Mexico is a pageant in Estado de México, Mexico, that selects that state's representative for the national Mexicana Universal pageant.

In 2002, 2004, 2006, 2008 and 2010 was not sent to a State Representative.

The State Organization produced the first Nuestra Belleza México in 1994 with Luz María Zetina, she being the first and only woman from her state to win a crown of Nuestra Belleza México.

Nuestra Belleza Estado de México is located at number 9 with a crown of Nuestra Belleza México/Mexicana Universal.

Titleholders
Below are the names of the annual titleholders of Mexicana Universal Estado de México, listed in ascending order, and their final placements in the Mexicana Universal after their participation, until 2017 the names was Nuestra Belleza Estado de México.

 Competed in Miss Universe.
 Competed in Miss International.
 Competed in Miss Charm International.
 Competed in Miss Continente Americano.
 Competed in Reina Hispanoamericana.
 Competed in Miss Orb International.
 Competed in Nuestra Latinoamericana Universal.

Designated Contestants
As of 2000, isn't uncommon for some States to have more than one delegate competing simultaneously in the national pageant. The following Nuestra Belleza Estado de México contestants were invited to compete in Nuestra Belleza México.

External links
Official Website

Estado de Mexico
State of Mexico